Pomacentrus grammorhynchus, the Bluespot damselfish, is a damselfish species described by Henry Weed Fowler in 1918. Pomacentrus grammorhynchus is part of the genus Pomacentrus and the family Pomacentridae.

References 

grammorhynchus
Taxa named by Henry Weed Fowler
Animals described in 1917